When I Am God is the debut album by American metalcore band, Oh, Sleeper. It was released on October 23, 2007, in the United States through Solid State Records.

After being noticed by Solid State by their release of their EP The Armored March in 2006, the band began recording When I Am God in the course of 2007 with all of the songs from the EP re-recorded along with several new tracks. A music video for the song "Vices Like Vipers" was produced and released in 2007.

Track listing

Personnel
Oh, Sleeper
Micah Kinard - lead vocals, programming
Shane Blay - lead guitar, clean vocals
James Erwin - rhythm guitar
Lucas Starr - bass guitar
Ryan Conley - drums, percussion

Production
Produced by Andreas Lars Magnusson

References

External links
[ Billboard.com: Album Review]

2007 debut albums
Oh, Sleeper albums
Solid State Records albums